Mia Khalifa (born 1993) is a Lebanese-American media personality and former pornographic film actress and webcam model. She began acting in pornography in October 2014, becoming the most viewed performer on Pornhub in two months. Her career choice was met with controversy in the Middle East, especially for a video in which she performed sexual acts while wearing a hijab.

Early life
Born in Lebanon and raised Catholic in what she describes as a "very conservative" home, Khalifa attended a French-language private school in Beirut, where she also learned to speak English. She moved with her family to the United States in 2001, leaving their home in the wake of the South Lebanon conflict. After moving to the United States, her family lived in Montgomery County, Maryland, where she played lacrosse in high school. She has said she was bullied at school for being "the darkest and weirdest girl there", which intensified after the September 11 attacks. She attended Massanutten Military Academy in Woodstock, Virginia, and later graduated from the University of Texas at El Paso with a Bachelor of Arts in history. She supported herself while there by working as a bartender, model, and "briefcase girl" on a local Deal or No Deal-esque Spanish game show.

Pornographic film career
Khalifa entered the professional pornographic film industry in October 2014. Her stage name was taken from the name of her dog, Mia, and American rapper Wiz Khalifa.

She came to widespread attention after the release of a scene from Bang Bros in which she wears a hijab during a threesome with Sean Lawless and Julianna Vega. The scene brought Khalifa instant popularity, as well as criticism from writers and religious figures, and led to her parents publicly disowning her. Alex Hawkins, Vice President of Marketing for xHamster, said "The outrage it caused in the Arab world ended up being a bit of a 'Streisand effect'. Suddenly, everyone was searching for her. The effort to censor her only made her more ubiquitous." With more than 1.5 million views, the 22-year-old Khalifa became the most searched-for performer on the adult video sharing website Pornhub. On December 28 that year, Pornhub revealed that she was the No. 1 ranked performer on their website."

After becoming the most searched-for actress on Pornhub, Khalifa received online death threats, including a manipulated image of Khalifa being held captive by an Islamic State executioner and a warning that she would be "the first person in Hellfire", to which she jokingly replied, "I've been meaning to get a little tan recently." Lebanese newspapers wrote articles critical of Khalifa, which she considered trivial due to other events in the region.

In an interview with The Washington Post, Khalifa said the controversial scene was satirical and should be taken as such, claiming that Hollywood films depicted Muslims in a far more negative light than any pornographer could. Among those who publicly spoke out to defend her decision to become an adult performer was British-Lebanese author Nasri Atallah, who stated, "The moral indignation ... is wrong for two reasons. First and foremost, as a woman, she is free to do as she pleases with her body. As a sentient human being with agency, who lives halfway across the world, she is in charge of her own life and owes absolutely nothing to the country where she happened to be born." Khalifa herself said of the controversy: "Women's rights in Lebanon are a long way from being taken seriously if a Lebanese American porn star that no longer resides there can cause such an uproar. What I once boasted to people as being the most Westernized nation in the Middle East, I now see as devastatingly archaic and oppressed."

According to data from Pornhub, from January 3 to 6, 2015, searches for Khalifa increased five-fold. Around a quarter of those searches came from Lebanon, with substantial searches also from nearby countries Syria and Jordan. Almaza, a Lebanese brewery, ran an advertisement showing a bottle of their beer next to Khalifa's signature glasses, with the slogan: "We are both rated 18+." In January 2015, pop-rap duo Timeflies released a song titled "Mia Khalifa" in homage to her.

In January 2015, Khalifa signed a long-term contract with Bang Bros' parent company, WGCZ Holding, who also own the largest free porn site XVideos. The contract required her to perform in multiple films each month. However, two weeks later, Khalifa had a change of heart and resigned. The negative attention she received from her global attention prompted her to leave the industry: "It was an eye-opener for me. I don't want any of this, whether it's positive or negative—but all of it was negative. I didn't think too much into it about how my friends and family and relationships were suffering." WGCZ Holding own a web page with a domain name using her stage name. Khalifa said it does not pay her for rights, even though it is written in her first-person voice.

In a July 2016 interview with The Washington Post, Khalifa stated that she had only performed in pornography for three months and had left the industry over a year before, changing to a "more normal job." She said, "I guess it was my rebellious phase. It wasn't really for me. I kind of smartened up and tried to distance myself from that." She said she continued to perform as a webcam model for Bang Bros for eleven months after she stopped shooting scenes before Complex Networks offered her to host a sports show. Carter Cruise, a former performer who became a disc jockey, criticized Khalifa for reinforcing the social stigma against sex work in distancing herself from her previous career.

In January 2017, xHamster reported that Khalifa was the most searched-for adult actress of 2016. In 2018, three years after leaving the industry, she was still the second-highest ranked person on Pornhub. In August 2019, Khalifa stated that she made $12,000 working in porn by making an estimated $1,000 per scene – standard contractor compensation from production studios in the industry, according to Alec Helmy, president and publisher of adult entertainment industry news site XBIZ – and that she did not receive residuals from BangBros or from Pornhub and other free sites where BangBros uploaded the videos. While PornHub has not stated how much revenue Khalifa's videos had generated for the site, according to a 2019 estimate by Social Blade CEO Jason Urgo based on YouTube-like advertising revenue per-view, she could have made over $500,000 had she been a PornHub partner. In July 2020, more than 1.5 million people signed a Change.org petition campaigning for her videos to be removed from sites like Pornhub and BangBros and her Internet domains returned to her. BangBros sent her a cease and desist letter and set up a website to dispute statements she made about the company. BangBros says that Khalifa earned over $178,000 from them and their affiliates and was in the adult industry for more than two years.

Other work
After three months working as an adult-film actor, Khalifa worked in Miami as a paralegal and bookkeeper. She transitioned into a career as a social media personality, webcam model, and sports commentator. She runs a YouTube channel; live streams on Twitch, and performed as a webcam model; sells photoshoots, merchandise, and access to exclusive content on membership website Patreon; and sold explicit photoshoots and videos on the social media website Findrow. Dan Steinberg of The Washington Post wrote in 2016 that, despite Khalifa's change of career, her social media feed was "still a bit more risqué than that of, say, Ben Bernanke."

She has used her social media presence to support professional sports teams from the Washington, D.C. area. She and Gilbert Arenas hosted Out of Bounds, a daily sports show on Complex News's YouTube channel, from October 2017 to February 2018. Afterwards, Khalifa co-hosted "Sportsball" alongside Tyler Coe on Rooster Teeth. Its final episode was released on October 30, 2018.

In May 2020, she had a guest appearance as herself in the Hulu show Ramy.

Personal life
Khalifa married her high school boyfriend in February 2011. They separated in 2014 and divorced in 2016. In 2019 she married professional chef Robert Sandberg; they separated in 2020. As of 2022, she is in a relationship with Puerto Rican rapper Jhayco.

She said in 2015 that she was no longer a practicing Catholic.

Khalifa has a tattoo of the opening line of the National Anthem of Lebanon and another of the Lebanese Forces Cross. She got the latter after the October 2012 Beirut bombing, stating it was to "show solidarity with [her] father's political views." Both tattoos have come under scrutiny by her detractors. She has revealed that her parents stopped speaking to her because of her career choice. Her parents released a statement disassociating themselves from her actions and blaming her decision to enter the porn industry on her residence in a foreign country which had a different culture than theirs, and that her actions did not reflect her upbringing. They also said that they hoped that she would leave pornography, believing that her image did not honor her family or home country.

In popular culture
In November 2016, an online petition called for Khalifa to be appointed by President-elect Donald Trump as the next United States Ambassador to Saudi Arabia.

In 2018, the musical duo iLoveFriday released a diss track called "Mia Khalifa," in response to a fake tweet posted by a user impersonating Khalifa. The song became an internet meme after the "hit or miss" snippet gained popularity on the TikTok app. At the time, it was said to be one of the most well-known viral TikTok meme in the Western world, and had been used in over four million TikTok videos.

At the 2021 CPI on the COVID-19 pandemic in Brazil,  senator Luis Carlos Heinze mentioned that a study published in The Lancet on the effectiveness of chloroquine as a COVID treatment was carried out by a company whose sales manager was a pornographic film actress. In response, senator Randolfe Rodrigues jokingly proposed "summon[ing] Mia Khalifa". Khalifa then wrote on Twitter, "I'm not a doctor, so don't take medical advise  from fake memes of me you found on WhatsApp."

See also
 Women in Lebanon

References

Further reading

External links

 
 
 
 

1993 births
Actresses from Miami
American color commentators
American pornographic film actresses
Lebanese pornographic film actresses
American TikTokers
Lebanese emigrants to the United States
Living people
Actresses from Beirut
People from Montgomery County, Maryland
Pornographic film actors from Florida
Rooster Teeth people
Sports commentators
Twitch (service) streamers
University of Texas at El Paso alumni
Webcam models
Writers from Beirut
21st-century American women